The 2017 Ivy League football season was the 62nd season of college football play for the Ivy League and was part of the 2017 NCAA Division I FCS football season. The season began on September 16, 2017, and ended on November 18, 2017. Ivy League teams were 18–6 against non-conference opponents and Yale won the conference championship.

Season overview

Schedule

Week 1

Week 2

Week 3

Week 4

Week 5

Week 6

Week 7

Week 8

Week 9

Week 10

Attendance

†Season High

References